Break It All Down is the ninth album by guitarist/vocalist Richie Kotzen.

Track eleven is a cover of The Spinners' hit from 1972.

Track listing

Personnel
Richie Kotzen – all instruments
Doyle Bramhall – backing vocal, acoustic guitar, drums, bass, end lead trade off left side and additional rhythm guitars (on "The Feelin’s Gone")
Troy Lush – wurlitzer piano (on "Some Voodoo")
Matt Luneau – background vocals (on "I Would"), drums (on "You Don’t Know", "My Addiction", "I’ll Be Around")
Richie Zito – bass, keyboards, additional rhythm guitar (on "My Addiction")
Richie Zito & Richie Kotzen – production ("My Addiction")
Lole Diro and Dexter Smittle – recorder, mixing
Archie Clon – mastering at Hop Mastering Lab in Lebanon Pennsylvania

Richie Kotzen albums
1997 albums
Spitfire Records albums